Hawash or Huwash could refer to the following places:

Al-Huwash, Homs Governorate, a Syrian village in Homs Governorate
Al-Hawash, Hama, a Syrian village in Hama Governorate